Godhavi is a village located in Sanand taluka of Ahmedabad district, Gujarat, India. Majority people in village are Darbar cast with surname Vaghela.

References

Villages in Ahmedabad district
Settlements in Gujarat